Claudio Corti may refer to:

 Claudio Corti (climber) (1928–2010), Italian mountain climber
 Claudio Corti (motorcycle racer) (born 1987), Italian Grand Prix motorcycle racer
 Claudio Corti (cyclist), Italian professional racing cyclist